Horst Paulmann Kemna (born 22 March 1935) is a German-Chilean billionaire entrepreneur.  He is founder and chairman of Cencosud, the largest retail chain in Chile and the third largest in Latin America. According to Forbes, as of July 2022 his net worth is estimated at US$2.3 billion.

Early life
In 1946, Horst Paulmann and his family, consisting of his parents and seven siblings, emigrated from Germany after the end of World War II. They crossed the Alps towards Italy, continued on to Argentina in 1948, and finally to Chile in 1950.

At the age of 13, Paulmann worked as a telephone operator in Buenos Aires and later worked making wooden toys. His family settled in the city of Temuco in the south of Chile, and his father got a position as a franchisee at Club Alemán and at Club de La Unión. In 1952, Paulmann's family bought a local restaurant called Las Brisas and they soon transformed it into a supermarket. Since then and after the death of his father, Horst and his brother Jürgen Paulmann built a series of supermarket chains, beginning with the first hypermarket, located on Av. Kennedy. It measured 4,000 square meters and would become the foundation of the holding company Cencosud.

Career
Cencosud was founded by Horst Paulmann on 10 November 1978 when he assumed the role of CEO and chairman. Cencosud employs more than 150,000 people in Chile, Argentina, Colombia, Brazil and Peru, where it operates its supermarket chains (such as Jumbo, Santa Isabel, Disco, Vea, Gbarbosa, Prezunic, Bretas, Perini, Wong and ); department stores (such as París and Johnson's); home improvement stores (such as Easy and Blaisten); commercial centers and credit stores (with over 4.3 million credit cards issued).

One of his projects is the complex Costanera Center, which includes the tallest tower in South America, measuring 300 meters, a six-story mall, a hotel, and office towers.

In 2004, Cencosud began trading its shares on the Santiago Stock Exchange, and on the NYSE starting in 2011. The Paulmann family is the main shareholder of Cencosud. Manfred, Peter and Heike Paulmann Koepfer have represented Cencosud in its directory and are part of the agreement of the board of directors, which was formed for the succession of the president in the conduct of the company.

Other activities
Paulmann is the president of the Argentina–Chile Permanent Binational Business Board and a member of Argentine Business Association. In the past, he was director of the Chilean–German Chamber of Commerce and the Chilean Chamber of Commerce.

Awards
 Entrepreneur of the Year Diario Financiero (2012)
 World Entrepreneur of The Year 2012, by Ernst & Young (2012)
 Konex Awards, Service and Commerce Entrepreneur (2008)
 Member of The Year, Chilean–German Chamber of Commerce and Industry (2007)
 University Extension Award, Universidad Mayor (2006)
 People and Development of Distinction Award granted during the Percade Congress (2006)
 Chilean citizenship by grace (2005)
 ICARE Award, Entrepreneur of the Year (2005) 
 ASA Salvador D’Anna Award for best retail entrepreneur of the year - Argentina (2005)
 Decoration from Orden de Mayo for his degree of Commander - Argentina (2004)
 Diego Portales Award for outstanding entrepreneur (2004)

Personal life
He had three children with Helga Koepfer: Manfred, Peter and Heike.

References

External links
 Official site

Living people
1935 births
German emigrants to Chile
Chilean businesspeople
Chilean billionaires
People from Santiago
Naturalized citizens of Chile